K. Mallappa may refer to

Kollur Mallappa, Indian Politician from Kalyana-Karnataka.
Kannavara Mallappa, Indian Politician from Davanagere, Karnataka.
Kuttur Mallappa, Indian Politician from Kodagu, Karnataka.

Indian masculine given names